Leucopogon grammatus  is a species of flowering plant in the heath family Ericaceae and is endemic to the south-west of Western Australia. It is an erect shrub with hairy young branchlets, spirally arranged, erect, egg-shaped leaves, and white, bell-shaped to broadly bell-shaped flowers.

Description

Taxonomy
Leucopogon grammatus was first formally described in 2016 by Michael Hislop in the journal Nuytsia from specimens he collected near Three Springs in 2006. The specific epithet (grammatus) means "striped with raised lines", referring to the lower leaf surface.

Distribution and habitat
This leucopogon grows in low heath between Walkaway and the Arrino district in the Geraldton Sandplains bioregion of south-western Western Australia.

Conservation status
Leucopogon grammatus is listed as "Priority Three" by the Government of Western Australia Department of Biodiversity, Conservation and Attractions, meaning that it is poorly known and known from only a few locations but is not under imminent threat.

References

grammatus
Ericales of Australia
Flora of Western Australia
Plants described in 2016